Gilkey is a surname. Notable people with the surname include:

Art Gilkey (1926–1953), American geologist and mountaineer
Bernard Gilkey (born 1966), former Major League Baseball player
Bertha Gilkey (1949–2014), African-American activist of tenant management of public housing properties
Garrett Gilkey (born 1990), American football offensive guard
Gordon Gilkey (1912–2000), American artist, educator, and promoter of the arts from Oregon
Helen Margaret Gilkey (1886–1972), American mycologist and botanist
Howard Gilkey (1890–1972), American landscape architect
John Charles Gilkey, book and document thief
John Gilkey, American actor, comedian, juggler and clown
Langdon Brown Gilkey (1919–2004), American Protestant Ecumenical theologian
Peter B. Gilkey (born 1946), American mathematician
Randy Gilkey (born 1976), American singer, songwriter and producer
Richard Gilkey (1925–1997), American painter, often associated with the 'Northwest School' of artists

See also
Gilkeya, a genus of fungi